The 1951 Northern Illinois State Huskies football team represented Northern Illinois State Teachers College—now known as Northern Illinois University—as a member of the Interstate Intercollegiate Athletic Conference (IIAC) during the 1951 college football season. Led by 23rd-year head coach Chick Evans, the Huskies compiled an overall record of 9–0 with a mark of 6–0 in conference play, winning the IIAC title. The team played home games at the 5,500-seat Glidden Field, located on the east end of campus, in DeKalb, Illinois.

Schedule

References

Northern Illinois State
Northern Illinois Huskies football seasons
College football undefeated seasons
Interstate Intercollegiate Athletic Conference football champion seasons
Northern Illinois State Huskies football